Kırmıtlı  is a small belde (town) in the central district (Osmaniye) of Osmaniye Province, Turkey. At  it lies along Ceyhan River. It is situated at the east end of Çukurova (Cilicia of the antiquity) plains. The population of Kırmıtlı is 1007  as of 2010. The town is a part of a bird sanctuary known as Castabala valley. There are ruins of the ancient city of Castabala around the town.

References

Populated places in Osmaniye Province
Towns in Turkey
Osmaniye Central District